Miss San Marino is a national beauty pageant for unmarried women in San Marino. The winners have represented their country at Miss International in 2000 and 2001, and Miss Europe in 2001 and 2002.

Winners
Color key

See also 
 Miss Italy

External links 

Beauty pageants in San Marino
Sammarinese awards